Down on the Farm is a 1938 American comedy film directed by Malcolm St. Clair and starring Jed Prouty, Spring Byington and Louise Fazenda. It was part of Twentieth Century Fox's Jones Family series. The family go to stay at their aunt's farm.

The film's sets were designed by the art directors Bernard Herzbrun and Boris Leven.

Cast
 Jed Prouty as John Jones  
 Spring Byington as Mrs. John Jones 
 Louise Fazenda as Aunt Ida  
 Russell Gleason as Herbert Thompson  
 Kenneth Howell as Jack Jones 
 George Ernest as Roger Jones  
 June Carlson as Lucy Jones  
 Florence Roberts as Granny Jones  
 Billy Mahan as Bobby Jones  
 Eddie Collins as Cyrus Sampson  
 Dorris Bowdon as Tessie Moody  
 Roberta Smith as Emma Moody  
 Marvin Stephens as Tommy McGuire  
 William Haade as Hefferkamp 
 John T. Murray as Marvin  
 William Irving as Coleman 
 Ernie Adams as Pony Concessioner  
 Sidney Blackmer as Political Boss  
 Dick Elliott as Slicker 
 Harrison Greene as Committeeman 
 Donald Haines as Boy in Drug Store 
 Si Jenks as Slim 
 Fred Kelsey as Bit Role  
 Alexander Leftwich as Committeeman 
 Wilfred Lucas as Wheeler  
 Francis Sayles as Member of Chamber of Commerce  
 Syd Saylor as Painter  
 John Sheehan as Fire Chief

References

Bibliography
 Bernard A. Drew. Motion Picture Series and Sequels: A Reference Guide. Routledge, 2013.

External links
 

1938 films
1938 comedy films
American comedy films
Films directed by Malcolm St. Clair
20th Century Fox films
American black-and-white films
1930s English-language films
1930s American films